Conforti is an Italian surname. Notable people with the surname include:

Gino Conforti (born 1932), American actor
Giovanni Battista Conforti (fl. 1550–1570), Italian composer
Giovanni Luca Conforti or Conforto (1560–1608), Italian composer and prominent falsetto singer
Guido Maria Conforti, Italian archbishop, canonized 2011 (see Archdiocese of Ravenna)
Mattea Conforti (born 2006), American actress
Michael Conforti,  American television writer
Pierluigi Conforti (born 1946), Italian motorcycle road racer
Visitación Conforti (born 1953), Argentine biologist

See also
Conforte
Nicola Conforto (1718–1793), Italian composer

Italian-language surnames